Temporal space may refer to:

 Deep temporal space
 Infratemporal space